Ken Landgraf (born 1950) is an American comic book artist and commercial illustrator.

Early life and education
Kenneth Landgraf was born in Sheboygan, Wisconsin. He admired the work of comic book artists like Reed Crandall, Russ Heath, Sam Glanzman, Jim Steranko, and Wally Wood, among others. Landgraf described his early interest in comics:

Landgraf attended Holy Name Catholic School and later graduated from North Sheboygan High School. As a young man he served in the Navy in Vietnam, and upon returning from the war, joined the Navy Reserve. Landgraf settled in New York as a student attending the School of Visual Arts on the G.I. Bill. At this time he produced his first commercial artwork for various pulp magazines.  Determined to become a professional comic book artist, he studied with Will Eisner and Harvey Kurtzman. Landgraf worked as an assistant to comic book artists Howard Nostrand, Gil Kane, and Rich Buckler. 

Landgraf took his early samples to DC Comics and Marvel Comics. Landgraf said:

Comics
Landgraf's artwork appeared in DC Comics publications from 1977 to 1981: The Witching Hour #85; Ghosts #68, #71 – 76, #82, #91, and #101; Weird War Tales #89, and The Unexpected #202 and #216. He penciled "Adventures of Nightwing and Flamebird" stories in The Superman Family from issues #184 -193, as well as Hawkman stories in World's Finest Comics #262, #264 – #266.

In addition, Landgraf worked with Tony DeZuniga's Action Art Studios as a member of "The Tribe," inking various Marvel Comics projects in the years 1977–1979. He drew new material for Marvel Treasury Edition #26 (1980) for Marvel, which was reprinted in The Incredible Hulk and Wolverine #1 in 1986.

Landgraf self-published Rock Comics #1 (1979) through his company Landgraphics Publications, in an 11" by 15" format. It featured art by Neal Adams, Armando Gil, Dave Simons, and Landgraf. It lasted one issue. He also created Starfighters, which lasted 5 issues.

He illustrated comics for heavy metal bands Vikon and Thor Rock Warrior, as well as for Revolutionary Comics on a Pink Floyd comic book series. He inked John Jacobs on Dr. Peculiar comics.
 He also produced fetish comics using the pseudonym "Dancer" under the direction of Eric Stanton.

Other work
Landgraf created storyboard and onscreen art for television shows such as Law & Order, MTV, The Cosby Mysteries, HBO, Showtime, and Lifetime Network, as well as The Adventures of the Galaxy Rangers and Avenue Amy animated TV shows.  Landgraf painted a large mural at the New York Film Academy. 

He produced color illustrations for the Harris Publications magazines Tactical Knives, Combat Handguns, and White Tail Deer Hunter. 

In the 1980s, Landgraf taught comic book drawing and anatomy at Parsons School of Design.

Landgraf was referenced in Can Rock & Roll Save the World?: An Illustrated History of Music and Comics by Ian Shirley; The Weird World of Eerie Publications by Mike Howlett; and Bad Mags by Tom Brinkmann.

References

1950 births
American comics artists
Living people
School of Visual Arts alumni